Cambria Heights is a residential neighborhood in the southeastern portion of the New York City borough of Queens. It is bounded by Springfield Boulevard and Francis Lewis Boulevard to the west, the Elmont, Nassau County border on the east, Queens Village to the north, St. Albans to the west, and Montefiore Cemetery and Laurelton, Springfield Gardens and Rosedale to the south. As of 2010, Cambria Heights's population was 18,677. The neighborhood is part of Queens Community Board 13.

Etymology

The name Cambria Heights was coined in the mid 1920s when the Cambria Title Savings and Trust Company, a bank based in Cambria County, Pennsylvania, provided financing for early development which was aimed at families seeking to relocate from rental apartments in other boroughs.

Education
The public elementary schools in Cambria Heights are PS 176 Cambria Heights (grades PK–5) and PS/MS 147 Ronald McNair (PK–8). There are four magnet high schools on the campus of Andrew Jackson High School, which are dedicated to: arts and humanities; business computer applications; mathematics, science and technology; and law, government and community service.

Religion
Cambria Heights has a high concentration of Christian church communities. There are many storefront churches located along Linden Boulevard, from a variety of denominations as well as nondenominational groups. Cambria Heights is also home to Cambria Heights Community Church, Prince of Peace Lutheran Church, Holy Trinity Parish Church, Queens Tabernacle Church, First Faith Baptist Church, Harvest Revival Christian Fellowship, Good Life Deliverance Ministry, Saint David's Episcopal Church, and Sacred Heart Catholic Church. The Catholic parish has an affiliated school. Sacred Heart Catholic Academy.

Cambria Heights is also the location of the Ohel, the resting place of the Lubavitcher Rebbe, Rabbi Menachem M. Schneerson and his predecessor Rabbi Yosef Yitzchak Schneersohn. Tens of thousands of visitors from around the world flock to the site for prayer and blessing.

Demographics
Based on data from the 2010 United States Census, the population of Cambria Heights was 18,677, a decrease of 2,267 (10.8%) from the 20,944 counted in 2000.

The racial makeup of the neighborhood was 1.4% (259) White, 90.3% (16,862) African American, 0.2% (42) Native American, 0.8% (157) Asian, 0.0% (6) Pacific Islander, 0.3% (62) from other races, and 1.7% (325) from two or more races. Hispanic or Latino of any race were 5.2% (964) of the population.

The original population consisted primarily of Roman Catholics of Italian, German, and Irish descent, and Jewish families relocating from Brooklyn. The present neighborhood has a large middle class Caribbean and African American population. The median home cost is $450,600.

Historic districts
The New York City Landmarks Preservation Commission designated two historic districts within the neighborhood in June 2022: the Cambria Heights–222nd Street Historic District and the Cambria Heights–227th Street Historic District. Both historic districts were originally predominantly white, like the rest of the neighborhood, but African-American families began moving to the areas by the 1950s, followed by Caribbean-American families in the 1980s. Prior to the creation of the two districts, Cambria Heights did not have any city-designated landmarks.

The Cambria Heights–222nd Street Historic District consists of 46 Storybook-style houses on 222nd Street between 115th Road and 116th Avenue, completed in 1931. The 222nd Street houses contain brick facades, Tudor arched windows, various geometric motifs, multicolored terracotta  roof shingles, and chimneys with stucco-and-brick panels. These houses were designed by the firm of Monda & Bertolazzi, based in Ozone Park, Queens.

The Cambria Heights–227th Street Historic District consists of 50 Storybook-style houses on 227th Street between 116th Avenue and Linden Boulevard, also completed in 1931. The houses on 227th Street largely contain stone, brick, and stucco facades, with multicolored roof shingles and rhombus windows. These were the only houses in Cambria Heights designed by Queens-based firm Wolosoff Brothers.

Transportation
Bus lines that serve through the neighborhood include the  local buses, connecting to the New York City Subway and other bus routes in Queens, as well as the  express bus.

Notable residents

Notable current and former residents of Cambria Heights include:

 Michael Bentt (born 1964), retired heavyweight boxer turned actor of Jamaican lineage
 Fred Cambria (born 1948), retired professional baseball player, a right-handed pitcher who appeared in six Major League games
 Bob Cousy, Pro Basketball Hall of Famer attended Andrew Jackson High School
 Chick Corea (1941–2021), a Miles Davis band veteran, played electric piano for Stan Getz.
 Bud Harrelson (born 1944), shortstop for the New York Mets championship team of 1969
 Lena Horne (1917–2010), singer
 Henry Petroski (born 1942), whose 2002 book Paperboy: Confessions of a Future Engineer describes his teenage years in Cambria Heights.
 Rick Pitino (born 1952), head basketball head coach at the University of Louisville
 Lillian Roberts (born 1928), labor leader who served from 2002 through 2014 as the Executive Director of District Council 37 (DC37), the largest municipal union in New York City.
 Jackie Robinson (1919-1972), baseball player
 Barbara Rubin (1945–1980), filmmaker
 Maggie Van Ostrand, writer
 Dennis Walcott (born 1951), Deputy Mayor for Education and Community Development in administration of Michael Bloomberg; before that, President and CEO of New York Urban League
 Mary Weiss (born 1948), lead singer of the Shangri-Las

References

External links

 Cambria Heights, NY Home Town Locator
 Cambria Heights, Homebuyers, NYC Housing Preservation and Development

 
Neighborhoods in Queens, New York